Maximilian Brandl (born 25 June 1997) is a German cross-country mountain biker. He competed in the cross-country race at the 2020 Summer Olympics.

He competed at the 2018 UCI Mountain Bike World Championships, winning a silver medal in the team relay.

Major results

2015
 1st  Team relay, European Championships
 1st  National Junior XCO Championships
 2nd  UCI Junior World XCO Championships
 3rd  European Junior XCO Championships
2017
 1st  National Under-23 XCO Championships
 3rd  UCI Under-23 World XCO Championships
2018
 2nd  Team relay, UCI World Championships
2019
 1st  National XCO Championships
 3rd  European Under-23 XCO Championships
 4th Overall UCI Under-23 World Cup
2020
 1st  National XCO Championships
2021
 3rd  UCI World XCC Championships

References

External links

1997 births
Living people
German male cyclists
Cyclists at the 2020 Summer Olympics
Olympic cyclists of Germany
German mountain bikers
Cross-country mountain bikers
People from Lohr am Main
Sportspeople from Lower Franconia
Cyclists from Bavaria
21st-century German people